Daphne McClure (born 1930) is an English artist who is notable for her paintings of her native Cornwall.

Biography
McClure was born in Helston and studied at the local Redruth Art School before continuing her training at Hornsey College of Art in London. She went on to study at the Central School of Arts and Crafts before working at the Royal Opera House, ROH, in Covent Garden. McClure worked in the production department of the Opera House for many years as both a costume and set designer. In 1976 she left the ROH and moved to Porthleven in Cornwall to concentrate on her painting. There she became a member of both the Newlyn Society of Artists and the Penwith Society of Artists.
She painted local landscapes often featuring derelict tin mining sites, small towns and harbours.

Works by McClure were included in the exhibition, Some of the Moderns at the Belgrave Gallery in 1990 and in the Artists from Cornwall show at the Royal West of England Academy in 1992. A solo show of her work was held at the Penwith Gallery during 1996 and 1997 and she twice won awards at the Newlyn Contemporaries exhibition in the late 1980s.

References

1930 births
Living people
20th-century English painters
20th-century English women artists
21st-century English painters
21st-century English women artists
Alumni of Middlesex University
Alumni of the Central School of Art and Design
English women painters
Landscape artists
Painters from Cornwall
People from Helston